Diego López Díaz (born 13 November 1994) is a Mexican Paralympic swimmer.

Career
He represented Mexico at the 2016 Summer Paralympics and at the 2020 Summer Paralympics, where he won a gold medal in the 50 meters freestyle S3 event and a bronze medal in the 50 meters backstroke S3 event. He also participated in the 2019 Parapan American Games, where he won five gold medals.

References

External links
 Profile at Paralympic.com

1994 births
Living people
Paralympic swimmers of Mexico
People from Xalapa
Swimmers at the 2016 Summer Paralympics
Swimmers at the 2020 Summer Paralympics
Medalists at the 2019 Parapan American Games
Medalists at the 2020 Summer Paralympics
Paralympic gold medalists for Mexico
Paralympic silver medalists for Mexico
Paralympic bronze medalists for Mexico
Paralympic medalists in swimming
Sportspeople from Veracruz
Mexican male freestyle swimmers
Mexican male backstroke swimmers
Mexican male medley swimmers
Medalists at the World Para Swimming Championships
S3-classified Paralympic swimmers
21st-century Mexican people